Miodrag Vesković (born September 23, 1950) is a Serbian professional basketball coach.

Coaching career 
Vesković coached the Željezničar Sarajevo and Elemes Šibenik in the Yugoslav Women's League. With Elemes Šibenik he won the National Championship in 1990–91 season. Later, he coached Hemofarm in the Basketball League of Serbia and Montenegro, Lavezzini Parma in the Italian Serie A1 and Spartak Noginsk in the Russian Premier League.

Vesković coached men's teams such as Saint Petersburg Lions for the 2000–01 Euroleague season and Arkadia Traiskirchen in the Austrian Bundesliga.

National team 
Vesković was appointed four times as the head coach for women's national team of Yugoslavia and Serbia. He coached the national team under all four state names: SFR Yugoslavia, FR Yugoslavia, Serbia and Montenegro and Serbia. He coached SFR Yugoslavia national team at the 1991 European Women Basketball Championship where he won silver medal. Vesković coached FR Yugoslavia and Serbia and Montenegro national teams at 1999 EuroBasket Women and 2003 EuroBasket Women.

Career achievements 
 Yugoslav Women's League champion: 1 (with Elemes Šibenik: 1990–91)
 FR Yugoslavia Women's Cup winner: 1 (with Hemofarm: 1998–99)

Personal life 
Vesković married Gordana Grubin (born 1972), a Serbian retired basketball player.

References

1950 births
Living people
Sportspeople from Sarajevo
Yugoslav basketball coaches
Serbian men's basketball coaches
Serbian expatriate basketball people in Austria
Serbian expatriate basketball people in Croatia
Serbian expatriate basketball people in Russia
Serbian expatriate basketball people in Italy
Serbs of Bosnia and Herzegovina
Serbia and Montenegro national basketball team coaches
Serbia national basketball team coaches
Bosnia and Herzegovina women's basketball coaches